Morning Noon Night is Jim Guthrie's second album on Three Gut Records.

Track listing
 "In The Hour Of Her Sore Need" – 1:45
 "Evil Thoughts" – 3:49
 "Virtue" – 3:37
 "3 AM" – 3:23
 "Turn Musician" – 3:22
 "Days I Need Off" – 5:10
 "Trouble" – 5:36
 "Toy Computer" – 2:35
 "Houndz of Love" – 3:50
 "Communication" – 3:39
 "Right And Right Again" – 2:45
 "1901" – 6:37

References

2002 albums
Jim Guthrie (singer-songwriter) albums
Three Gut Records albums